Andrew Stewart (26 September 1871 – 23 August 1939) was a Scottish footballer who played as an outside right.

Career
Stewart played club football for Partick Thistle, Third Lanark, Queen's Park and St Bernard's, with his status as an amateur allowing him to move fairly freely between clubs. He made one appearance for Scotland in 1894.

His elder brother David was also a footballer with Queen's Park and Scotland.

Notes

References

1871 births
1939 deaths
Footballers from Glasgow
People from Gorbals
Scottish footballers
Scotland international footballers
Third Lanark A.C. players
Queen's Park F.C. players
St Bernard's F.C. players
Association football outside forwards
Scottish Football League players
Scottish Junior Football Association players
Partick Thistle F.C. players